Denis Aleksandrovich Tumasyan (born 24 April 1985) is a Russian football coach and a former player of Armenian descent who played as a centre-back. He is an assistant coach with FC Chayka Peschanokopskoye.

Club career
He made his Russian Premier League debut for FC Torpedo Moscow on 17 March 2006 in a game against FC Tom Tomsk.

On 27 January 2019, FC Ufa announced that Tumasyan was released from his contract by mutual consent to join Armenian club FC Alashkert.

Personal life
Denis is the older brother of Aleksandr and Sergei Tumasyan and a son of Aleksandr Tumasyan.

Career statistics

Club

References

External links
  Profile at championat.ru

1985 births
Living people
Footballers from Kyiv
Russian footballers
Association football defenders
Armenian footballers
FC SKA Rostov-on-Don players
FF Jaro players
FC Torpedo Moscow players
FC Ural Yekaterinburg players
FC Ufa players
Ukrainian people of Armenian descent
Russian expatriate footballers
Expatriate footballers in Finland
Veikkausliiga players
Kakkonen players
Russian Premier League players
Jakobstads BK players
FC Alashkert players
Expatriate footballers in Armenia
FC Chayka Peschanokopskoye players